Grand Prix Justiniano Hotels is the name of two cycling races:
Grand Prix Justiniano Hotels (men's race)
Grand Prix Justiniano Hotels (women's race)